The Temple of Mut, also named Temple B300, is a temple at Jebel Barkal in Northern State, Sudan. It is situated about 400 km north of Khartoum near Karima and stands near a large bend of the Nile River, in the region that was called Nubia in ancient times. The partially rock-cut temple was built on the west side base of the Jebel Barkal pinnacle, from which angle it assumed the shape of an Uraeus wearing the White Crown of Upper Egypt. Dedicated to the goddess Mut, the wife of Amun, the Temple of Mut was erected by pharaoh Taharqa in the 680s BCE, at a time when he ruled Upper and Lower Egypt.

History
Restoring a ruined structure abandoned by New Kingdom pharaohs, named B300-sub, Taharqa built an outer temple of cut stone masonry comprising entrance kiosk, pylon, Bes pillars, columns topped with sistrum-headed Hathor capitals and carved five wall painted chambers into the rock base to honor the goddess Mut, who believed to dwell together with the state-god Amun inside Jebel Barkal. From the outer structure only two of the Hathor columns still survive, but the rock-cut chambers are in good shape and were cleaned and restored from 2015 to 2018.

Setting
The rock-chambers contain restored paintings with representations of Amon, Taharqa and lion-headed or human-headed forms of the Double Crown wearing Mut. The paintings are accompanied by hieroglyphic inscriptions, where Taharqa says that he found the temple built by the "ancestors" in "humble work", and that he rebuilt it as "splendid work". The figures are painted in ochre and white kaolin on a background painted in Egyptian blue. Alluding in some regard to the myth of the Eye of Ra, the goddesses represented in the Temple of Mut played important roles both in the myth of the divine origin of the king and in coronation ceremonies.

Reliefs and paintings

See also
 List of ancient Egyptian sites, including sites of temples

References

Sources
 

Archaeological sites in Sudan
Nubia
Northern (state)
History of Nubia
Egyptian temples
Twenty-fifth Dynasty of Egypt
Kingdom of Kush